The fifth season of The Real Housewives of Orange County, an American reality television series, was broadcast on Bravo. It aired from November 5, 2009 until March 11, 2010, and was primarily filmed in Orange County, California. Its executive producers are Adam Karpel, Alex Baskin, Douglas Ross, Gregory Stewart, Scott Dunlop, Stephanie Boyriven and Andy Cohen.

The Real Housewives of Orange County focuses on the lives of Vicki Gunvalson, Jeana Keough, Tamra Barney, Lynne Curtin, Gretchen Rossi and Alexis Bellino. It consisted of 17 episodes.

Production and crew
In April, 2009 The Real Housewives of Orange County was renewed for a fifth season by Bravo. The season premiere "When Times Get Tough, The Tough Go Shopping!" was aired on November 5, 2009, while the fifteenth episode "Is This All There Is?" served as the season finale, and was aired on March 4, 2010. It was followed by a two-part reunion special that aired on March 10 and March 11, 2010, which marked the conclusion of the season. Adam Karpel, Alex Baskin, Douglas Ross, Gregory Stewart, Scott Dunlop, Stephanie Boyriven and Andy Cohen are recognized as the series' executive producers; it is produced and distributed by Evolution Media.

Cast and synopsis
Five of the six housewives featured on the fourth season of The Real Housewives of Orange County initially returned for the fifth instalment. With Peterson's departure midway during season four, it only left five remaining wives. Original housewife Jeana Keough decide to depart from the series on the third episode "It Ends in Coto de Caza" that aired on November 19, 2009. Keough reportedly left the series due to being undervalued saying "I just didn’t feel appreciated by the girls or the network." After the departure of Keough, it made Vicki Gunvalson the only remaining original cast member as of season six. A new housewife was featured on the series to fill Keough's place, Alexis Bellino who is described as a "spicy blonde who unabashedly lives life on her terms." Bellino made her debut to the series on the second episode of the season, and was officially made a full-time cast member in the fourth episode, "It's All About Choices", the episode after Keough's departure.

Gretchen Rossi begins dating after Jeff's death, but still remains in contact with his adult kids. Rossi's new boyfriend leaves the ladies talking due to it being Slade Smiley, a former boyfriend of two previous wives Jo De La Rosa and Lauri Peterson. Away from the feuding and gossip, Rossi debuts her beauty line Gretchen Christine Beaute. Rossi and Barney frequently clash despite an attempted reconciliation. Barney struggles with her husband's dominance and control as the kids begin to witness the tension between the two. Despite attempts to fix the marriage such as getting a tattoo of her husband's name, Barney later asks for a divorce. Barney and Keough, along with their husband suffer from financial difficulties caused by the collapsing economy. After struggling with the collapsing economy, Keough's business is greatly affected. Keough pulls back from the fellow wives to focus on her business. Barney also needing to make more money, jumps back into the real estate game. Lynne Curtin continues her endeavors with her jewelry line. Curtin struggles with being in the middle of Rossi and Barney's drama seeing as she and Barney have grown a lot closer. As she grows closer to Barney a divide begins to form between her and Rossi as she feels Rossi has overstepped her boundaries with her daughter.
It's all new for Curtin as she settles into her new home in Laguna Beach and gets a face-lift, however Lynne continues to struggle with disciplining her daughters. Curtin's happiness doesn't last long as she receives an eviction notice, which leaves her questing her trust in her husband. Gunvalson continues to balance her professional career and her personal life. Gunvalson attempts to repair her relationship with her husband Donn, they renew their vows. Bellino and her husband Jim raises their toddler-aged twin girls, Melania and Mackenna, and their son, James with the same Christian values they both hold dear. The other ladies question Bellino's' marriage and just how reliant she is on her husband, which leaves Bellino and Gunvalson feuding and drives Gunvalson to seek support from, now former wife, Keough.

Episodes

References

External links

 
 
 

2009 American television seasons
2010 American television seasons
Orange County (season 5)